Walpole railway station was a station in Norfolk. It is now disused.

First opened in 1882, it was part of the Midland and Great Northern Joint Railway line between the Midlands and the Norfolk coast. It took its name from the cluster of villages surrounding Walpole Hall, being nearest to Walpole Cross Keys. It was located very close to the Lincolnshire border. It closed along with the rest of the line in 1959.

References

Disused railway stations in Norfolk
Former Midland and Great Northern Joint Railway stations
Railway stations in Great Britain opened in 1866
Railway stations in Great Britain closed in 1959
1866 establishments in England
1959 disestablishments in England